The Open Neural Network Exchange (ONNX) []  is an open-source artificial intelligence ecosystem of technology companies and research organizations that establish open standards for representing machine learning algorithms and software tools to promote innovation and collaboration in the AI sector. ONNX is available on GitHub.

History 
ONNX was originally named Toffee and was developed by the PyTorch team at Facebook. In September 2017 it was renamed to ONNX and announced by Facebook and Microsoft. Later, IBM, Huawei, Intel, AMD, Arm and Qualcomm announced support for the initiative.

In October 2017, Microsoft announced that it would add its Cognitive Toolkit and Project Brainwave platform to the initiative.

In November 2019 ONNX was accepted as graduate project in Linux Foundation AI.

In October 2020 Zetane Systems became a member of the ONNX ecosystem.

Intent 
The initiative targets:

Framework interoperability 
Allow developers to more easily move between frameworks, some of which may be more desirable for specific phases of the development process, such as fast training, network architecture flexibility or inferencing on mobile devices.

Shared optimization 
Allow hardware vendors and others to improve the performance of artificial neural networks of multiple frameworks at once by targeting the ONNX representation.

Contents 
ONNX provides definitions of an extensible computation graph model, built-in operators and standard data types, focused on inferencing (evaluation).

Each computation dataflow graph is a list of nodes that form an acyclic graph. Nodes have inputs and outputs. Each node is a call to an operator. Metadata documents the graph. Built-in operators are to be available on each ONNX-supporting framework.

See also 

 Neural Network Exchange Format
 Comparison of deep learning software
 Predictive Model Markup Language an XML-based predictive model interchange format
 PicklingTools: an open-source collection of tools for allowing C++ and Python systems to share information quickly and easily.

References

External links 
 
 

Microsoft free software
Software using the Apache license
Neural network data exchange formats
2017 software